Hands Up, Eddy Polo (German: Hände hoch, hier Eddy Polo) is a 1928 German silent action film directed by Léo Lasko and starring Eddie Polo, Ernst Reicher and Otz Tollen.

The film's sets were designed by the art director Karl Görge.

Cast
 Eddie Polo as Eddy Polo 
 Steffi Lorée as Kleine Assistentin Steffi 
 Ernst Reicher as Kommissar Grant
 Otz Tollen as Lord Winshope 
 Ogima Barcelona as Gutsverwalter 
 Corry Bell as Lady Winshope 
 Hannelore Benzinger as Russenmarie 
 Fritz Genschow as Russenphilipp 
 Alexandra Schmitt as Mutter

References

Bibliography
 Alfred Krautz. International directory of cinematographers, set- and costume designers in film, Volume 4. Saur, 1984.

External links

1928 films
1920s action films
German action films
Films of the Weimar Republic
German silent feature films
Films directed by Léo Lasko
German black-and-white films
1920s German films